Ronaldo da Silva Souza (born 23 October 1996), simply known as Ronaldo, is a Brazilian footballer who plays for J1 League club Shimizu S-Pulse.

Club career

Flamengo
Born in Itu, São Paulo, Ronaldo joined Flamengo's youth setup in 2013, from Paulista. He made his first team – and Série A – debut on 1 November 2015, coming on as a late substitute for Jajá in a 2–0 away loss against Grêmio.

On 19 April 2016, after impressing with the under-20s in the year's Copa São Paulo de Futebol Júnior, Ronaldo renewed his contract until 2020. He was rarely used in the following two campaigns, and was loaned to fellow top tier side Atlético Goianiense on 5 September 2017, until the end of the year.

Atlético Goianiense (loan)
Ronaldo scored his first professional goal on 17 September 2017, netting his team's third in a 3–1 away win against Ponte Preta. After contributing with one goal in nine appearances for Dragão, he returned to Fla ahead of the 2018 campaign, but again featured rarely.

Bahia (loan)
On 9 July 2019 Ronaldo was loaned to Série A club Bahia through the end of the year.

Shimizu S-Pulse
After the end of contract with Flamengo Ronaldo became a free agent and signed with J1 League club Shimizu S-Pulse on 1 July 2021.

Career statistics

Honours
Flamengo
Campeonato Carioca: 2017, 2019
Campeonato Brasileiro:2019

Copa Libertadores da América 2019

References

External links
Flamengo profile 

1996 births
Living people
Footballers from São Paulo (state)
Brazilian footballers
Association football midfielders
Campeonato Brasileiro Série A players
J1 League players
CR Flamengo footballers
Atlético Clube Goianiense players
Esporte Clube Bahia players
Shimizu S-Pulse players
Brazilian expatriate footballers
Expatriate footballers in Japan